Nazarovka is a rural locality (a khutor) in Maryevskoye Rural Settlement, Olkhovatsky District, Voronezh Oblast, Russia. The population was 476 as of 2010. There are 6 streets.

Geography 
Nazarovka is located 17 km northwest of Olkhovatka (the district's administrative centre) by road. Yasinovka is the nearest rural locality.

References 

Rural localities in Olkhovatsky District